Paul Frederick Platz (July 24, 1920 – June 15, 1991) was an American football player and coach. He served as the head football coach at the University of San Diego in 1959, compiling a record of 1–5. Platz played college football at California Polytechnic State University in San Luis Obispo, California in 1940. He later coach at Poway High School in San Diego County, California from 1961 to 1967.

Head coaching record

College

References

External links
 

1920 births
1991 deaths
Cal Poly Mustangs football players
San Diego Toreros football coaches
High school football coaches in California
Players of American football from California